In theoretical physics, the problem of time is a conceptual conflict between general relativity and quantum mechanics in that quantum mechanics regards the flow of time as universal and absolute, whereas general relativity regards the flow of time as malleable and relative.  This problem raises the question of what time really is in a physical sense and whether it is truly a real, distinct phenomenon. It also involves the related question of why time seems to flow in a single direction, despite the fact that no known physical laws at the microscopic level seem to require a single direction.  For macroscopic systems the directionality of time is directly linked to first principles such as the second law of thermodynamics.

Time in quantum mechanics 
In classical mechanics, a special status is assigned to time in the sense that it is treated as a classical background parameter, external to the system itself. This special role is seen in the standard formulation of quantum mechanics. It is regarded as part of an a priori given classical background with a well defined value. In fact, the classical treatment of time is deeply intertwined with the Copenhagen interpretation of quantum mechanics, and, thus, with the conceptual foundations of quantum theory: all measurements of observables are made at certain instants of time and probabilities are only assigned to such measurements.

Special relativity has modified the notion of time. But from a fixed Lorentz observer's viewpoint time remains a distinguished, absolute, external, global parameter. The Newtonian notion of time essentially carries over to special relativistic systems, hidden in the spacetime structure.

Overturning of absolute time in general relativity 
Though classically spacetime appears to be an absolute background, general relativity reveals that spacetime is actually dynamical; gravity is a manifestation of spacetime geometry.  Matter reacts with spacetime: 

Also, spacetime can interact with itself (e.g. gravitational waves). The dynamical nature of spacetime has a vast array of consequences.

The dynamical nature of spacetime, via the hole argument, implies that the theory is diffeomorphism invariant. The constraints are the imprint in the canonical theory of the diffeomorphism invariance of the four-dimensional theory. They also contain the dynamics of the theory, since the Hamiltonian is zero (identically vanishes). The quantum theory has no explicit dynamics; wavefunctions are annihilated by the constraints and Dirac observables commute with the constraints and hence are constants of motion. Kuchar introduces the idea of "perennials" and Rovelli the idea of "partial observables". The expectation is that in physical situations some of the variables of the theory will play the role of a "time" with respect to which other variables would evolve and define dynamics in a relational way. This runs into difficulties and is a version of the "problem of time" in the canonical quantization.

Proposed solutions to the problem of time 
The quantum concept of time first emerged from early research on quantum gravity, in particular from the work of Bryce DeWitt in the 1960s:

In other words, time is an entanglement phenomenon, which places all equal clock readings (of correctly prepared clocks – or of any objects usable as clocks) into the same history. This was first understood by physicists Don Page and William Wootters in 1983. They made a proposal to address the problem of time in systems like general relativity called conditional probabilities interpretation. It consists in promoting all variables to quantum operators, one of them as a clock, and asking conditional probability questions with respect to other variables. They arrived at a solution based on the quantum phenomenon of entanglement. Page and Wootters showed how quantum entanglement can be used to measure time.

In 2013, at the Istituto Nazionale di Ricerca Metrologica (INRIM) in Turin, Italy, Ekaterina Moreva, together with Giorgio Brida, Marco Gramegna, Vittorio Giovannetti, Lorenzo Maccone, and Marco Genovese performed the first experimental test of Page and Wootters' ideas. They confirmed that time is an emergent phenomenon for internal observers but absent for external observers of the universe just as the Wheeler–DeWitt equation predicts.

Consistent discretizations approach developed by Jorge Pullin and Rodolfo Gambini have no constraints. These are lattice approximation techniques for quantum gravity. In the canonical approach if one discretizes the constraints and equations of motion, the resulting discrete equations are inconsistent: they cannot be solved simultaneously. To address this problem one uses a technique based on discretizing the action of the theory and working with the discrete equations of motion. These are automatically guaranteed to be consistent. Most of the hard conceptual questions of quantum gravity are related to the presence of constraints in the theory. Consistent discretized theories are free of these conceptual problems and can be straightforwardly quantized, providing a solution to the problem of time. It is a bit more subtle than this. Although without constraints and having "general evolution", the latter is only in terms of a discrete parameter that isn't physically accessible. The way out is addressed in a way similar to the Page–Wooters approach. The idea is to pick one of the physical variables to be a clock and asks relational questions. These ideas, where the clock is also quantum mechanical, have actually led to a new interpretation of quantum mechanics — the Montevideo interpretation of quantum mechanics. This new interpretation solves the problems of the use of environmental decoherence as a solution to the problem of measurement in quantum mechanics by invoking fundamental limitations, due to the quantum mechanical nature of clocks, in the process of measurement in quantum mechanics. These limitations are very natural in the context of generally covariant theories as quantum gravity where the clock must be taken as one of the degrees of freedom of the system itself. They have also put forward this fundamental decoherence as a way to resolve the black hole information paradox. In certain circumstances, a matter field is used to de-parametrize the theory and introduce a physical Hamiltonian. This generates physical time evolution, not a constraint.

Reduced phase space quantization constraints are solved first then quantized. This approach was considered for some time to be impossible as it seems to require first finding the general solution to Einstein's equations. However, with use of ideas involved in Dittrich's approximation scheme (built on ideas of Rovelli) a way to explicitly implement, at least in principle, a reduced phase space quantization was made viable.

Avshalom Elitzur and Shahar Dolev argue that quantum mechanical experiments such as the Quantum Liar provide evidence of inconsistent histories, and that spacetime itself may therefore be subject to change affecting entire histories. Elitzur and Dolev also believe that an objective passage of time and relativity can be reconciled, and that it would resolve many of the issues with the block universe and the conflict between relativity and quantum mechanics.

One solution to the problem of time proposed by Lee Smolin is that there exists a "thick present" of events, in which two events in the present can be causally related to each other, but in contrast to the block universe view of time in which all time exists eternally. Marina Cortês and Lee Smolin argue that certain classes of discrete dynamical systems demonstrate time asymmetry and irreversibility, which is consistent with an objective passage of time.

Weyl time in scale-invariant quantum gravity 
Motivated by the Immirzi ambiguity in loop quantum gravity and the near conformal invariance of the standard model of elementary particles, Charles Wang and co-workers have argued that the problem of time may be related to an underlying scale invariance of gravity-matter systems. Scale invariance has also been proposed to resolve the hierarchy problem of fundamental couplings. As a global continuous symmetry, scale invariance generates a conversed Weyl current according to Noether’s theorem. In scale-invariant cosmological models, this Weyl current naturally gives rise to a harmonic time. In the context of loop quantum gravity, Charles Wang et al suggest that scale invariance may lead to the existence of a quantized time.

The thermal time hypothesis 

Generally covariant theories do not have a notion of a distinguished physical time with respect to which everything evolves. However, it is not needed for the full formulation and interpretation of the theory. The dynamical laws are determined by correlations which are sufficient to make predictions. But then a mechanism is needed which explains how the familiar notion of time eventually emerges from the timeless structure to become such an important ingredient of the macroscopic world we live in as well as of our conscious experience.

The thermal time hypothesis has been put forward as a possible solution to this problem by Carlo Rovelli and Alain Connes, both in  classical and quantum theory. It postulates that physical time flow is not an a priori given fundamental property of the theory, but is a macroscopic feature of thermodynamical origin.

References

Further reading
 The Order of Time by Carlo Rovelli
 Time Reborn by Lee Smolin
 The Singular Universe and the Reality of Time by Lee Smolin and Roberto Mangabeira Unger

Philosophy of physics
Philosophical problems
Quantum gravity
Theoretical physics
Philosophy of time